The 1999 Asian Karate Championships are the 4th edition of the Asian Karate Championships, and were held in Singapore from 1 to 2 December 1999.

Medalists

Men

Women

Medal table

References
 Results

External links
 AKF Official Website

Asian Championships
Asian Karate Championships
Asian Karate Championships
Karate Championships